Barda Na Dungar (Gujarati: બરડાના ડુંગર), preceded by Ajavasnan Matsya, is a Gujarati language poetry collection written by Pravin Pandya. The book won Uma-Snehrashmi Prize (2008-09).

Content 
The book is consist of 23 poems which have been published in Kavilok, a Gujarati poetry journal, during 1994 to 2004.

Award 
The book was awarded by Uma-Snehrashmi Prize (2008-09) by Gujarati Sahitya Parishad.

References

2009 poetry books
Gujarati-language poetry collections
Indian poetry collections
2009 in India
21st-century Indian books